Discula destructiva is a fungus in the family Gnomoniaceae which causes dogwood anthracnose, affecting populations of dogwood trees native to North America.

It was introduced to the United States in 1978 and is distributed throughout the Eastern United States and the Pacific Northwest. Its origins are unknown. It typically occurs in cool, wet spring and fall weather. One can avoid this fungus by watering dogwoods during drought and general cultural control care.

Species affected: Cornus florida and Cornus nuttallii.

References

External links
 Species Profile- Dogwood Anthracnose (Discula destructiva), National Invasive Species Information Center, United States National Agricultural Library. Lists general information and resources for Dogwood Anthracnose.

Diaporthales
Taxa named by Elias Magnus Fries